The Kabini dam is built on the Kabini River in Bidarahally and Beechanahally villages of Heggadadevanakote Taluk in Mysore district of Karnataka, India. The main purpose of the dam is to provide drinking water and irrigation of 22 villages and 14 hamlets and also generate electricity. The dam also provides water to two other dams which are Sagaredoddakere and Upper Nugu Dams. It is an earthen dam with a masonry spillway on the left bank. The reservoir filling period is June to November and depleting period is November to May. It is part of a small Hydel power project.

References

Kaveri River
Dams in Karnataka